Gary Bernard Fenlon (born 30 October 1954) is an Australian politician. He was a Labor member for the Legislative Assembly of Queensland from 1989 to 1995 and 1998 to 2009.

Born in Rockhampton, he was an industrial advocate and high school teacher before entering parliament. He served on Griffith University Council from 1990 to 1996.

At the 1989 Queensland state election, Fenlon was elected to parliament as the Labor member for Greenslopes. He held the seat for two terms before his loss to Liberal candidate Ted Radke at the 1995 state election. He recovered the seat by defeating Radke at the 1998 state election, holding the seat until his retirement in 2009.

References

 

                   

1954 births
Living people
Members of the Queensland Legislative Assembly
Australian Labor Party members of the Parliament of Queensland
21st-century Australian politicians